Algernon "Algie" Brown (born November 29, 1991) is an American football fullback who is currently a free agent. He played college football at Brigham Young.

Professional career

Seattle Seahawks
Brown signed with the Seattle Seahawks as an undrafted free agent on May 12, 2017. He was waived on July 29, 2017.

New York Jets
On August 5, 2017, Brown signed with the New York Jets. He was waived on August 13, 2017.

Kansas City Chiefs
On June 14, 2018, Brown signed with the Kansas City Chiefs. He was waived on September 1, 2018.

References

External links
BYU Cougars Bio
Seattle Seahawks Bio
New York Jets Bio

1991 births
Living people
American sportspeople of Samoan descent
Players of American football from Salt Lake City
21st-century Mormon missionaries
American football fullbacks
BYU Cougars football players
Seattle Seahawks players
New York Jets players
Kansas City Chiefs players